James A. Garfield High School is a public high school in the Seattle Public Schools district of Seattle, Washington, United States. It is named after James A. Garfield, the 20th President of the United States. Located along 23rd Avenue between E. Alder and E. Jefferson Streets in Seattle's urban Central District, Garfield draws students from all over the city. Garfield is also one of two options for the district's Highly Capable Cohort for academically highly gifted students, with the other being Ingraham International School. As a result, the school offers many college-level classes, ranging from calculus-based physics to Advanced Placement (AP) studio art.

History 
James A. Garfield High School was founded in 1920 as East High School at its current location. The first graduating class consisted of 282 students who transferred from Broadway High School. In three years, the school's enrollment forced the 12-room building to be scrapped for the Jacobean-style building designed by Floyd Naramore. In 1929, the city commissioned the architect to design an addition for the school as enrollment peaked at 2,300 students.

Garfield High School has long played a key role in its neighborhood, the Central District. As the Central District has changed, so has the school's population. In its early decades, the school was noted for its Jewish, Japanese and Italian populations. After World War II, the neighborhood became predominantly African-American and by 1961, 51 percent of Garfield students were black, compared to only 5.3 percent of the general Seattle school district population. In the late 1960s and 1970s, Garfield was at the center of the school district's attempts to avoid forced busing through various plans, including turning it into a "magnet school". This began the focus on music and science that persist to the present day. The school introduced an APP Program in 1979, and due to the success of this program, an alternative program, IBx, was opened for APP students at Ingraham International High School in North Seattle to help relieve pressure on an overcrowded Garfield.

Notable people who have spoken at Garfield include Martin Luther King Jr. and Jesse Jackson. Civil rights activist Stokely Carmichael spoke at the school in 1967. Future President Barack Obama gave a speech in 2006 regarding "Innovation in Education".

During a 2012 school field trip, one of the school's students allegedly raped another student. The school's mishandling of the ensuing investigation resulted in an ongoing federal investigation of the school district for Title IX sexual violence violations.

Remodel

The buildings have lasted for more than eight decades, but they were partially demolished in a sweeping redesign of the school that began in June 2006. The remodel was mostly completed by the fall of 2008, making the class of 2009 the only class to attend classes in both the old and new buildings. There was a movement to hold off the remodeling to preserve the building's history, including a city initiative to preserve the Quincy Jones auditorium as a historic site, thereby blocking the remodeling. The new design has a state-of-the-art performing arts center. After its renovation, Garfield had become the second most expensive high school in the state, after Stadium High School, with Stadium High at $106 million and Garfield at $105 million.

The school reopened in time for 2008 classes on September 3. Faculty and students vacated their temporary quarters at Lincoln High School at the end of the 2007–2008 school year.

Terracotta work
Garfield High School's architecture makes extensive use of terracotta. Among the many terracotta details worked into the building are emblems of botany, the trades, arts and crafts, industry, intelligence, and the sciences.

Academics 
Of the approximately 400 students who graduated in 2011, 70 percent planned to attend four-year colleges, and 20 percent planned to attend two-year colleges. Garfield has over 200 students in IEP (Individualized Learning) and ELL (English Language Learners) programs, along with 415 APP (Accelerated Progress Program) students. The school currently offers 21 Advanced Placement courses and 10 honors courses. In 2012, the mean reading, math and writing SAT scores for Garfield students were 575, 578 and 569, respectively. Languages offered are Spanish, French, and Japanese.

Garfield was one of 14 schools in King County in 2007 to receive the "School of Distinction" award from the office of superintendent of public instruction for making the most progress over six years in reading and writing on the WASL. The school has a silver medal of distinction from U.S. News & World Report in 2008 and 2009 for being among the top-performing high schools in terms of college readiness. The school is noted for producing a number of National Merit Scholars each year, and Garfield consistently produces more National Merit Scholars each year than any other public school in Washington state. Garfield frequently competes for the highest number of National Merit Scholars of any school in the state, including private schools. Garfield students make up more than 70 percent of the Seattle Public School students who take AP exams.

Each year there are many valedictorians, most of whom go on to top universities. In June 2005, 44 valedictorians graduated. In recent years, however, the school has faced widespread criticism that white students are served through AP and honors programs, and black students are not supported. During the 2006–2007 school year Garfield offered more than 120 different classes across nine departments, including an extensive selection of advanced classes. Garfield students can take classes from local community colleges through a program called Running Start, and online courses from Stanford's EPGY and Johns Hopkins University's CTY program. Some students attend on-campus courses at the University of Washington.

Testing controversy
In January 2013, the entire teaching body of Garfield High School refused to administer the standardized Measures of Academic Progress, or MAP, which is administered system-wide, three times per year. The teachers called the tests useless and a waste of instructional time. After their protest became public, teachers at local schools nearby such as Ballard High School and Chief Sealth International High School joined the movement. The American Federation of Teachers has endorsed the school's boycott of the tests.

Athletics 

Garfield athletics have been strong historically. Athletic successes for the 1950s included four city football championships, two tennis titles, two baseball championships, and a state AA tournament trophy in basketball.  The boys basketball team has won the most Washington state championships in state history.

Garfield basketball teams have won many regional and state titles. The boys basketball team has won the state championship 16 times and was the runner-up eight times since 1949.  The team has notable alumni, including Brandon Roy (GHS c/o 2002), Tony Wroten (GHS c/o 2011), and University of Washington alumnus Will Conroy. The girls team boasts alumna Joyce Walker (GHS c/o 1980), who is best known as the third woman to join the Harlem Globetrotters.  The girls team won their third state championship in 2005. Both the girls and boys teams were state champions in 1980, 1987, and 2020.

In 2001, the boys swimming and diving team won the state championship. In 2007, the girls swimming and diving team won the state championship.

Garfield won state titles in boys and girls track in 1987 and 2017. The boys cross country team won the Metro League championship in 2016.

The football team made national headlines when they knelt during the U.S. national anthem to protest an allegedly racist verse continued within and police brutality in the United States. Their protest continued for the entirety of the 2016 season. Players on the team stated that they had received death threats and had their car's tires slashed due to the protests.

The fastpitch softball team made history in 2019 when they swept the postseason, winning the Metro League championship, Sea-King District championship, and WIAA 3A State Championship. The first time for a Seattle school. They defeated Yelm 10–6 in the championship game.

Programs, clubs, and activities

Drama

In 2005, Garfield's performance of Cabaret won the Outstanding Program and Poster Design award and Special Honors in Educational Impact and Student Achievement from the 5th Avenue Theatre. Subsequent musicals have been unable to enter the 5th Avenue Awards due to scheduling. One of the main draws of Garfield's drama program is its large student-led Drama Club, an important element that is missing from many other local area schools. The Garfield Drama Club produces collections of short one-act plays, and a main stage Autumn Show every year, all of which are directed and produced by current students. The department also performs two teacher-directed shows per year: a Children's Show for local elementary schools, and a Spring Musical.

Newspaper
The Messenger is Garfield's monthly student-run newspaper. The Messenger has earned awards from the Journalism Education Association and the National Scholastic Press Association: placing in Best of Show in the JEA/NSPA Spring National High School Journalism Conventions and winning its most prestigious honor, the Pacemaker Award, in 1997 and 2006. A column from the paper was reprinted by All About Jazz in 2004.
In 2006 and 2007, staff reporters won the NSPA's Brasler Prize.

Robotics 
Garfield has two FIRST Tech Challenge robotics teams: team 4042, Nonstandard Deviation and team 12788, Ultraviolet. Team 4042 was founded in 2009, and received the Rockwell Collins Innovate award at the 2018 West-Super Regional Championship and Washington State Championship, ultimately attending the Houston FIRST Championship in April 2018.

Policy debate 
Garfield is one of two schools in Seattle Public Schools with an active policy debate program. One of Garfield's teams beat Ingraham in the finals of the 2019 season's culminating tournament to become state champions.

Music 

The music program at Garfield High School has won numerous awards. Several notable musicians attended the school, including Jimi Hendrix, Lil Tracy, Quincy Jones, Macklemore, and Ernestine Anderson.

Vocal department 
The choirs at Garfield include a Treble Choir, Concert Choir and a Vocal Jazz group. In 2009, the vocal jazz ensemble received a special commendation for its performance at Lionel Hampton.

Orchestra 
The orchestra program includes a symphony orchestra, a concert orchestra, and a chamber music program. Every year, many students from the orchestra play in the Seattle Youth Symphony Orchestras, often in principal positions. Garfield students also play in the Seattle Conservatory of Music Starling Scholar Chamber Orchestra, and many community ensembles. Garfield orchestra members have had their original compositions debuted by the Seattle Symphony and SYSO. In 1995, Garfield guest conductor Gerard Schwarz, music director of the Seattle Symphony, said, "I don’t recall hearing a high school orchestra perform anywhere in this country on such a high level." Garfield has won numerous first-place awards in festivals around the world, including the Best Orchestra for Downbeat Magazine in both 1999 and 2007, and the National Orchestra Cup in 2011. The Garfield Symphony Orchestra has also toured and performed in Japan, Europe, Boston, Chicago, Los Angeles, and Carnegie Hall and Alice Tully Hall in New York.

Jazz Band 

Garfield's jazz program has won state, national and international awards and accolades in big band, combo and individual categories. Jazz Ensemble I has toured Europe numerous times, visiting the Netherlands, France, Switzerland, Germany, Belgium, Austria, Italy, and playing at venues including the Montreux and North Sea Jazz Festivals. It has also attended the International Association of Jazz Educators' conference, as well as the Essentially Ellington Competition in New York City. It is the only band to win the first-place trophy in consecutive years (2003–2004 and 2009–2010) and the only band to have been invited to Essentially Ellington for ten consecutive years. Overall showings at Essentially Ellington have included 1999 (honorable mention), 2000 (honorable mention), 2002 (2nd place), 2003 (1st place), 2004 (1st place), 2006 (3rd place), 2008 (2nd place), 2009 (1st place), 2010 (1st place), 2013 (finalist), 2014 (finalist), 2015 (finalist), 2016 (finalist), 2019 (finalist) and 2020 (finalist). Its consistent placement in national competitions and long history of national recognition indicate its status as one of the best high school jazz bands in the country.

Among the many other awards are seven sweepstakes wins since 2000 at the Clark College Jazz Festival (Vancouver, Washington), three sweepstakes wins (including two by Jazz Band II) at the Bellevue High School jazz festival (Bellevue, Washington), six sweepstakes awards at the Lionel Hampton Jazz Festival (Moscow, Idaho), and others wins at the Reno and Mount Hood jazz festivals.

Notable alumni

 Andrew Callaghan, Journalist, YouTube personality
 Ernestine Anderson, jazz and blues singer
 Debbie Armstrong, alpine ski racer and Olympic gold medalist
 Fred Bassetti, architect
 Jack Benaroya, real-estate mogul and philanthropist
 Ishmael Butler, Former College Basketball Player UMASS. Grammy award-winning musician with Digable Planets and Shabazz Palaces
 Linda Lee Cadwell, author and widow of martial arts master and actor Bruce Lee
 Irwin Caplan, creator of the cartoon Famous Last Words
 Deandre Coleman, NFL player for the Buffalo Bills
 Will Conroy, NBA and NBADL player
 Peter DePoe, drummer, Redbone
 Michael B. Druxman, screenwriter, playwright, biographer, film director
 Emma Dumont, actress
 Gisele Fox, high fashion model
 Frank E. Garretson, Brigadier general, U.S. Marine Corps
 Bruce Harrell, mayor of Seattle
 Jeff Heath, former MLB player (Cleveland Indians, Washington Senators, St. Louis Browns, Boston Braves)
 Richard Hedreen, hotelier
 Jimi Hendrix, rock musician 
 Steven Hill, actor (attended as Solomon "Sol" Krakovsky)
 Bill Hosokawa, author and journalist
 B. J. Johnson, swimmer
 Quincy Jones, music producer
 Shirley Kaufman, poet
 Aaron Kovar, professional footballer for the Los Angeles FC
 Aki Kurose, activist; completed high school in Minidoka Internment Camp
 Leah LaBelle, singer
 Dave Lewis, rock musician
 Peter Scott Lewis, composer 
 Miko Lim, fashion photographer
 Macklemore (Ben Haggerty), Seattle hip hop artist
 Mary McCarthy, novelist and critic 
 Ari Melber, journalist, chief legal correspondent for MSNBC
 William K. Nakamura, World War II Medal of Honor recipient
 Billy North, former MLB player (Chicago Cubs, Oakland Athletics, Los Angeles Dodgers, San Francisco Giants)
 Jaylen Nowell, NBA Player
 Frank Okada, painter
 Robert Prince, planner of successful Raid at Cabanatuan that freed 500+ WWII prisoners
 Henry Prusoff (1912–1943), tennis player
 Irvine Robbins, co-founder of the Baskin-Robbins ice cream parlor chain
 Brandon Roy, former NBA Rookie of the Year and All-Star for the Portland Trail Blazers and Minnesota Timberwolves
 Omari Salisbury, journalist, videographer, and founder of Converge Media
 Yasser Seirawan, chess grandmaster
 Lynn Shelton, film director and writer
 Roger Shimomura, sansei artist
 Chester Simmons, professional basketball player
 Doug Smart, college basketball player
 Isaiah Stanback, NFL player
 Joyce Walker, the third woman to join the Harlem Globetrotters
 Lindy West, feminist and journalist
 Eric Wilkins, former MLB player (Cleveland Indians)
 Tony Wroten, NBA player
 Minoru Yamasaki, architect of the former World Trade Center

 Tari Eason, NBA player with the Houston Rockets

References

External links

Garfield High School

1920 establishments in Washington (state)
Central District, Seattle
Educational institutions established in 1920
High schools in King County, Washington
Landmarks in Seattle
Magnet schools in Washington (state)
Public high schools in Washington (state)
Seattle Public Schools